Melfi Airport  is a public use airport located near Melfi, Guéra, Chad.

See also
List of airports in Chad

References

External links 
 Airport record for Melfi Airport at Landings.com

Airports in Chad
Guéra Region